The Ticonderoga class of guided-missile cruisers is a class of warships in the United States Navy, first ordered and authorized in the 1978 fiscal year. The class uses passive phased-array radar and was originally planned as a class of destroyers.

Ticonderoga-class guided-missile cruisers are multi-role warships. Their Mk 41 VLS can launch Tomahawk cruise missiles to strike strategic or tactical targets, or fire long-range anti-aircraft SM-2MR/ERs for defense against aircraft or anti-ship missiles. Their LAMPS III helicopters, RUM-139 ASROCs, and sonar systems allow them to perform anti-submarine missions. Ticonderoga-class ships are designed to be elements of carrier battle groups or amphibious ready groups, as well as perform missions such as interdiction or escort. With upgrades to their AN/SPY-1 phased radar systems and their associated missile payloads as part of the Aegis Ballistic Missile Defense System, members of this class have, in successive tests, repeatedly demonstrated their proficiency as mobile anti-ballistic missile and anti-satellite weaponry platforms.

Of the 27 completed vessels, 19 were built by Ingalls Shipbuilding and eight by Bath Iron Works (BIW). All but one of the ships in the class are named for noteworthy events in U.S. military history, and at least twelve share their names with World War II-era aircraft carriers. As of October 2022, 17 ships remain active. Due to the high cost of maintenance and age, the entire class is being progressively retired by Arleigh Burke-class Flight III destroyers in the immediate term. As of 2022, the last cruiser vessels are scheduled for decommissioning in 2027 after which there is no firepower equivalent with 122-cell VLS until the DD(X) destroyers are expected to enter commission in the 2030s with 128-cell VLS, but without the flagship facilities of the canceled CG(X) program.

History
The Ticonderoga class was originally ordered as guided missile destroyers, with the designation DDG-47. They would complement the much larger and more capable Strike Cruiser (CSGN) design. With the cancelation of the Strike Cruiser as well as the scaled-down CGN-42 (Virginia-class cruiser hull) alternative, some of the requirements were transferred to the DDG-47, and the class was eventually re-designated as guided missile cruisers, CG-47, to reflect the additional flagship capabilities added due to cancellation of the strike cruisers, which originally were expected act as flagships for the smaller destroyers. Ships of the class from CG-52 onwards were equipped with the Mk 41 vertical launch system.

As the Aegis combat system and the additional cruiser roles added substantial weight to the Spruance-derived hull, the design had limited growth potential in terms of weight and power margin. In the 1980s, a design study known as Cruiser Baseline (CGBL) was created to accommodate the capabilities of CG-52 (Mk 41-equipped ships of the Ticonderoga class) on a hull with design and construction techniques matching the DDG-51 for improved survivability and weight allowances.

Proposed early retirement
Due to Budget Control Act of 2011 requirements to cut the Defense Budget for FY2013 and subsequent years, plans were being considered to decommission some of the Ticonderoga-class cruisers. For the U.S. Defense 2013 Budget Proposal, the U.S. Navy was to decommission seven cruisers early in fiscal years 2013 and 2014.

Because of these retirements, the U.S. Navy was expected to fall short of its requirement for 94 missile defense cruisers and destroyers beginning in FY 2025 and continuing past the end of the 30-year planning period. While this was a new requirement as of 2011, and the U.S. Navy has historically never had so many large missile-armed surface combatants, the relative success of the Aegis ballistic missile defense system has shifted this national security requirement onto the U.S. Navy. Critics had charged that the early retirement of these cruisers would leave the Navy's ship fleet too small for the nation's defense tasks as the U.S. enacts a policy of "pivot" to the Western Pacific, a predominantly maritime theater. The U.S. House of Representatives passed a budget bill to require that these cruisers instead be refitted to handle the missile defense role.

By October 2012, the U.S. Navy had decided not to retire four of the cruisers early in order to maintain the size of the fleet. Four Ticonderoga-class cruisers, plus 21 Arleigh Burke-class destroyers, are scheduled to be equipped for anti-ballistic missile and anti-satellite operations.

In March 2019, the Navy proposed decommissioning the six oldest ships; Bunker Hill, Mobile Bay, Antietam, Leyte Gulf, San Jacinto, and Lake Champlain, in 2021 and 2022, instead of dry-docking them for life-extension maintenance updates, as a cost-saving measure. This would not technically be an "early retirement", as the ships would be at their originally planned 35-year life dates, but they would be able to serve longer with the upgrades. The proposal still needs the approval of Congress, which is usually hesitant to approve any actions that would reduce the size of the active combat fleet.

In December 2021, the House approved a bill that would allow the Navy to retire only five Ticonderoga-class cruisers versus the Navy's request to retire seven.

Proposed and Scheduled Retirements
In December 2020, the U.S. Navy's Report to Congress on the Annual Long-Range Plan for Construction of Naval Vessels stated that the following ships were planned to be placed Out of Commission in Reserve: At this time, the proposed dates were:

In July 2021, the Navy requested to retire seven cruisers in the Fiscal Year 2022, adding Lake Champlain (CG-57) to the six listed above. This request only included the Fiscal Year 2022 inactivations rather than the more common list for the next five years:

The final budget passed in December 2021 prohibited the Navy from using any funds "to retire, prepare to retire, inactivate, or place in storage more than 5 guided missile cruisers." The budget did not specify which cruisers could be retired, and the Navy ultimately chose to retire Monterey (CG-61), Hué City (CG-66), Anzio (CG-68), Vella Gulf (CG-72), and Port Royal (CG-73).

In April 2022, the Navy requested to retire all 17 remaining cruisers by the end of Fiscal Year 2027. The schedule was as follows:

Both the House and Senate draft budgets explicitly forbid retiring Vicksburg by name, as the ship is nearing the end of a modernization as part of the Phased Modernization Program (also known as the 2-4-6 Program). The House budget prohibits the Navy from using any funds "to retire, prepare to retire, inactivate, or place in storage more than four guided missile cruisers." Until the final budget is passed, all retirement requests are pending.

Replacement

In their 2015 budget request, the Navy outlined a plan to operate eleven cruisers, while the other eleven were upgraded to a new standard. The upgraded cruisers would then start replacing the older ships, which would be retired starting in 2019. This would retain one cruiser per aircraft carrier group to host the group's air warfare commander, a role for which the destroyers do not have sufficient facilities. Flight III Arleigh Burke-class destroyers equipped with the Air and Missile Defense Radar provide enhanced coverage, but putting the radar on standard destroyer hulls does not allow enough room for extra staff and command and control facilities for the air warfare commander. Destroyers can be used tactically for air defense, but they augment cruisers that provide command and control in a carrier group and are primarily used for other missions like defending other fleet units and keeping sea lanes open. Congress opposed the plan on the grounds that it makes it easier for Navy officials to completely retire the ships once out of service. The Navy would have to retire all cruisers from the fleet by 2028 if all are kept in service, while deactivating half and gradually returning them into service could make 11 cruisers last from 2035 to 2045.

Due to the large overlap in size and capabilities of its guided missile cruisers and destroyers, the Navy eventually coalesced them into a single class of large multi-mission ships with an emphasis on air and missile defense called Large Surface Combatants (LSC); in 2018, the Navy stated that a future LSC would have capabilities of the Flight III Arleigh Burke-class guided-missile destroyers as a starting baseline while having future growth margins and air defense command and control of the Ticonderoga class. Consequently, the short-term replacement for the first decommissioned cruisers is the Flight III Arleigh Burke class starting in the mid-2020s, while the last of the Ticonderoga-class cruisers and Flights I and II of the Arleigh Burke class will be replaced by the DDG(X) program in the early 2030s. The program office was established in June 2021, and design work was contracted starting in February 2022. Despite the designation, the DDG(X) is expected to be considerably larger and at least as capable as the Ticonderoga class.

Design

The Ticonderoga-class cruiser's design was based on that of the Spruance-class destroyer. The Ticonderoga class introduced a new generation of guided missile warships based on the Aegis phased array radar that is capable of simultaneously scanning for threats, tracking targets, and guiding missiles to interception. When they were designed, they had the most powerful electronic warfare equipment and the most advanced underwater surveillance system in the U.S. Navy. These ships were one of the first classes of warships to be built in modules, rather than being assembled from the bottom up.

The greater size and equipment on the CG-47-class cruisers increased displacement from 6,900 tons of the DD-963-class destroyers to 9,600 tons of displacement for the heavier cruisers. Aegis cruisers can steam in any ocean and conduct multi-warfare operations anywhere. Some cruisers reported some structural problems in early service after extended periods in extremely heavy seas; they were generally corrected from the late 1980s to the mid-1990s. Several ships had superstructure cracks, which were repaired.

These ships' superstructures were a modification of that on the Spruance-class destroyers and were required to support two deck-houses (one forward for antennas forward and starboard), and the aft deck-house housed the aft and port antenna arrays. The later Arleigh Burke-class Aegis destroyers are designed from the keel up to carry the SPY-1D radars and have them all clustered together on the forward deckhouse, saving space and weight and simplifying cooling requirements. The radar support equipment is closer together, minimizing cable runs and concentrating support equipment.

Operations research was used to study manpower requirements for the Ticonderoga class. It was found that four officers and 44 enlisted sailors could be removed from the ship's complement by removing traditional posts that had been made obsolete. However, manpower savings achieved by eliminating the very manpower-intensive Mk 26 guided missile system and replacing it with the far more capable and versatile Mk 41 Vertical Launching System (VLS) were harder to emulate with the Mk 45 127 mm (5") gun systems. The Aegis Cruisers are "double-enders", and along with the Zumwalt class, are the only surface combatants in the fleet that employ two large-caliber guns.

Vertical Launching System

In addition to the added radar capability, the Ticonderoga-class ships built after USS Thomas S. Gates (CG-51) included two Mark 41 Vertical Launching Systems (VLS). The two VLS allow the ship to have 122 missile storage and launching tubes that can carry a wide variety of missiles, including Tomahawk cruise missiles, Standard Missile -2MR/ER and -6 surface-to-air missiles, Evolved SeaSparrow surface-to-air missiles, and RUM-139 anti-submarine warfare (ASW) ASROCs. More importantly, the VLS enables all missiles to be on full standby at any given time, shortening the warship's response time before firing. The original five ships (Ticonderoga, Yorktown, Vincennes, Valley Forge, and Thomas S. Gates) had Mark 26 twin-arm launchers that limited their missile capacity to a total of 88 missiles and could only fire the SM-2MR and RUM-139. After the end of the Cold War, the less capable original five warships were limited to duties close to the home waters of the United States. 

A standard VLS loadout for a Ticonderoga cruiser as of 2018 is 12 SM-6s, 3 SM-2ERs, 56 SM-2MRs, 12 RIM-162 ESSMs, 10 SM-3s, 32 Tomahawks, and 6 RUM-139s. In addition, Ticonderogas carry 8 Harpoon anti-ship missiles in standalone launchers at the fantail of the ships.

Upgrades
Originally, the U.S. Navy had intended to replace its fleet of Ticonderoga-class guided-missile cruisers with cruisers produced as part of the CG(X) missile cruiser program; however, severe budget cuts from the 21st-century surface combatant program coupled with the increasing cost of the  destroyer program resulted in the CG(X) program being canceled. The Ticonderoga-class cruisers were instead to be replaced by Flight III  destroyers.

All five of the twin-arm (Mk-26) cruisers have been decommissioned. In 2003, the newer 22 of the 27 ships (CG-52 to CG-73) in the class were upgraded to keep them combat-relevant, giving the ships a service life of 35 years. In the years leading up to their decommissioning, the five twin-arm ships had been assigned primarily home-waters duties, acting as command ships for destroyer squadrons assigned to the eastern Pacific and western Atlantic areas.

As of July 2013, two cruisers have completed hull, mechanical, and electrical (HM&E) upgrades, and eight cruisers have had combat systems upgrades. These include an upgrade of the Aegis computational system with new computers and equipment cabinets, the SPQ-9B radar system upgrade introducing an increased capability over only gunfire control, optical fiber data communications and software upgrades, and modifications to the vertical launching system allowing two 8-cell modules to fire the RIM-162 ESSM. The most recent upgrade packages include SM-6 and Naval Integrated Fire Control – Counter Air (NIFC-CA) capability. Another upgrade is improving the SQQ-89A(V)15 sonar with a multi-function towed array. Hull, sonar, radar, electrical, computer, and weapons systems upgrades can cost up to $250 million per ship.

Service

Downing of Iran Air Flight 655

USS Vincennes (CG-49) achieved notoriety in 1988 when, amid a running gun battle with Iranian Revolutionary Guard gunboats, she shot down Iran Air Flight 655, resulting in 290 civilian deaths. The commanding officer of USS Vincennes, William C. Rogers III, believed the airliner to be an Iranian Air Force F-14 Tomcat fighter jet on an attack vector, based on misreported radar returns. The investigation report recommended that the Aegis large screen display be changed to allow the display of altitude information on plots and that stress factors on personnel using Aegis be studied.

Interception of United States satellite USA-193

On 14 February 2008, the United States Department of Defense announced that USS Lake Erie (CG-70) would attempt to hit the dead satellite USA-193 over the North Pacific Ocean just before it would burn up on reentry. On 20 February 2008, at approximately 22:30 EST (21 February, 03:30 UTC), an SM-3 was fired from Lake Erie, which struck the satellite. The military intended that the missile's kinetic energy would rupture the hydrazine fuel tank allowing the toxic fuel to be consumed during re-entry. The Department of Defense confirmed that the missile had directly hit the fuel tank.

Ships in class
As part of the federal budget, the Navy had originally requested to decommission seven cruisers in the fiscal year 2022 (FY 2022), releasing a schedule of when these ships would be retired, (note that as opposed to calendar years, fiscal years run from 1 October to 30 September). When Congress passed the final budget, they limited that number of retired cruisers to five. Concerns of lawmakers included the number of ships available in the battle force, how fast retired ships could be replaced with new ones, and overall costs. The budget did not specify which ships were to be retired but did specify certain ships that could not be retired due to factors such as expenditures on recent modernization programs.  

The table below includes the proposed retirements from the latest budget request for FY 2023. The retirements for the next fiscal year are proposed by the Navy, and they are not official until approved by Congress. Those for the next four years are proposed only and must be requested in that year's budget request. Until the final budget is passed, all retirement requests are pending.

Status summary

See also
 List of cruisers of the United States Navy
 List of naval ship classes in service
 Cruiser Baseline
 Type 055 destroyer, China PLA Navy
 Kirov-class battlecruiser, Russia
 Slava-class cruiser, Russia

References

External links

 U.S. Navy Fact File 
 Federation of American Scientists Report: Ticonderoga-class guided missile cruisers
 Global Security Article

 
Naval ships of the United States
Cruiser classes